The Minister of State for Diaspora was a ministerial post of the Albanian Government responsible for communicating and dealing with issues that affected the Albanian diaspora. Its minister was Pandeli Majko.

Subordinate institutions
 Coordinative Council of Diaspora
 National Diaspora Agency
 Diaspora Publication Center
 Diaspora Development Fund
 Albanian Diaspora Business Chamber

Officeholders

See also
Albanian diaspora

References

Diaspora
Albania